Anatoli Petrovich Aslamov (born 1 June 1953) is a Russian professional association football coach and a former player.

External links
 

1953 births
Living people
Soviet footballers
FC Sokol Saratov players
Russian football managers
FC Sokol Saratov managers
Russian Premier League managers
Association football midfielders
FC Iskra Smolensk players